is a 1974 Japanese science fiction television series. Not connected to Pierre Boulle's Planet of the Apes, it was produced by Tsuburaya Productions, and shot on 16mm film in color. The series ran on Tokyo Broadcasting System from October 6, 1974, to March 30, 1975, lasting a total of 26 episodes.

Summary
A female scientist named Kazuko Izumi and two young children, Jiro Sakaki and Yurika, mistakenly travel through time to a future, where the planet Earth is now ruled by human-sized, anthropomorphic apes. The trio struggle to find a way to get back home to the 20th century, with the help of one surviving human, Godo, and their little ape friend, Pepe.

Cast
 Reiko Tokunaga as Kazuko Izumi
 Hiroko Saito as Yurika
 Masaaki Kaji as Jirō Sakaki
 Tetsuya Ushio as Gōdo
 Baku Hatakeyama as Gebâ
 Kazue Takita as Pepe
 Kouko Kagawa as the voice of Pepe
 Hitoshi Omae as Bippu
 Noboru Nakaya as Dr. Takagi

Staff 

 Original Work: Sakyo Komatsu, Koji Tanaka, Yuitsune Toyota
 Producers: Yuichi Takahashi, Masaru Tadakuma (TBS Film Club)
 Screenplay: Keiichi Abe, Bunzo Wakatsuki, Shigemitsu Taguchi, Kiyosumi Fukasawa
 Music: Toshiaki Tsushima
 Photography: Yoshihiro Mori
 Lighting: Daisuke Hiragawa
 Art: Toyoichi Ohashi
 Assistant Directors: Masao Minowa, Takashi Okano
 Chiefs of Production: Kiyoshi Nanjo, Takashi Yamanaka
 Editor: Kisho Kobayashi
 Opticals: Michihisa Miyashige
 Mixers: Koshiro Jimbo, Hideo Takebe, Yoshiro Sako
 Scripter Girls: Yoshiko Sekine, Hiroko Toma, Chiyo Miyakoshi, Keiko Suzuka, Michiko Koike
 Makeup: Kosuke Tamiya
 Assistant Producer: Naoyuki Eto
 Visual Effects: Den Film Effects 
 Costumes by: Toho Costumes
 Recording: Nikkatsu Film Studio
 Effect: Nikkatsu Effects 
 Development: P.C.L
 Cooperation Dogashima Komatsu View Hotel, Kawaguchiko Wild Monkey Park
 Special technology: Kazuo Sagawa
 Directors: Kiyosumi Fukasawa, Atsushi Okunaka, Shunichiro Kazuki, Sogoro Tsuchiya

Production 
The series is a co-production of Tsuburaya Productions and Tokyo Broadcasting System. It developed by Keiichi Abe and directed by Kiyosumi Fukazawa, with music by Toshiaki Tsushima.

Time of the Apes
In 1987, television producer Sandy Frank edited together several episodes of the series, including the first and last episodes, into a 94-minute feature version called Time of the Apes. Syndicated to broadcast and cable outlets, this compilation film was also released on VHS by Celebrity Home Entertainment's Just for Kids Home Video in mid-1988.

The movie was then featured twice on Mystery Science Theater 3000, originally on KTMA in 1989, and then later as part of season 3 in 1991 on Comedy Central.

See also
 Planet of the Apes

Notes

References

External links
 Saru no Gundan

 Mystery Science Theater 3000 
 
 
 Episode guide: K17- Time of the Apes
 Episode guide: 306- Time of the Apes

1974 Japanese television series debuts
1975 Japanese television series endings
Tokusatsu television series
Tsuburaya Productions
Apes in popular culture
1987 films
1980s Japanese-language films
1980s Japanese films